Lee Min-young is a Korean name consisting of the family name Lee and the given name Min-young, and may refer to:

 Lee Min-young (actress) (born 1976), South Korean actress
 Min (Korean singer) (born Lee Min-young, 1991), South Korean singer, member of miss A